Podlasie is a region in north-east Poland.

Podlasie may also refer to the following villages in Poland:
Podlasie, Garwolin County
Podlasie, Płock County
Podlasie, Żyrardów County
Podlasie, Warmian-Masurian Voivodeship